Woodblock or wood block may refer to:
 Woodblock (instrument), a percussion musical instrument
 Woodblock printing, a method of printing in which an image is carved into the surface of a piece of wood
 Woodblock graffiti 
 Toy block, a type of construction toy often made out of wood